The MAAFL was a division of the United States Australian Football League and an Australian rules football competition based in the United States.

The league formed 1996 when clubs from Cincinnati and Louisville played the first ever game of Aussie Rules in the United States.

Unlike many Metro Footy leagues in the US, the MAAFL was a traditional 18-a-side Australian rules competition and was the oldest and arguably the best supported league in the country. It still holds the record for attendance.

Changes
As of 2007, the league split its teams into two divisions to reduce travel costs.

After 2013, the MAAFL gave way to the Central Region Tournament, one of three annual regional tournaments organized directly by the United States Australian Football League.

Championship Division

Second Division

Previous Teams

References

Australian football leagues in the United States
Sports leagues established in 1996